Samran Rat Subdistrict may refer to:
Samran Rat, a neighbourhood and subdistrict (khwaeng) in Bangkok
Samran Rat, Chiang Mai, a subdistrict (tambon) in Doi Saket District, Chiang Mai Province

th:สำราญราษฎร์